MMCT may refer to:

 Microcell-Mediated Chromosome Transfer
 Middle Miocene Climate Transition
 Mulanje Mountain Conservation Trust
 Mumbai Central railway station
 Chichen Itza International Airport (ICAO airport code MMCT)